Three competitors from Switzerland competed in two sports at the 1896 Summer Olympics.  The Swiss won one championship and placed second in two more events, for a total of three medals.  They had 8 entries in 5 events.

Medalists

Gymnastics

All of Switzerland's medals were won by Zutter in the gymnastics competitions.  Zutter's only event that did not result in a medal was in the horizontal bar.  Champaud (see Bulgaria at the 1896 Summer Olympics) entered three events, but did not medal in any.

Shooting

Baumann took 8th of 42 in the military rifle competition.

Notes

References

  (Digitally available at )
  (Excerpt available at )
 

Nations at the 1896 Summer Olympics
1896
Olympics